KFML (94.1 FM, "94 Rocks") is a radio station licensed to Little Falls, Minnesota, United States.  Previously, the call letters belonged to a Denver, Colorado free-form station. The station is currently owned by Little Falls Radio Corporation. The station carries an active rock format. KFML carries "The Dark" hosted by JZ, playing active rock music from the 2000s to the present with a strong empha sis on cutting edge new active rock. Prior to June 2021, KFML carried a hot adult contemporary format with the branding "FM94" and slogan "More Music, More Variety". KFML is also the radio home for Pierz Pioneer sports.

KFML is located in a studio at 16405 Haven Road, with its two sister stations.

Previous logo

References

External links

Radio stations in Minnesota
Active rock radio stations in the United States
Radio stations in St. Cloud, Minnesota
Morrison County, Minnesota